'Khamal Khel is the sub-tribe of the Swati (Pashtun tribe) tribe of Pashtun peoples.

References 

Pashtun tribes